Shorea collaris is a tree in the family Dipterocarpaceae, native to Borneo. The specific epithet collaris means "neck" and refers to the calyx of the fruit.

Description
The cracked bark is yellow to brown.

Distribution and habitat
Shorea collaris is endemic to Borneo.

Conservation
Shorea collaris has been assessed as vulnerable on the IUCN Red List. It is threatened by logging, including for its timber. It is also threatened by expansion of land for plantations, including for palm oil and other tree species. The species is not found in any protected areas.

References

collaris
Endemic flora of Borneo
Plants described in 1956